Bogdan Radenković (Srbovac, Ottoman Empire, 1874 – Thessaloniki, Greece, 30 July 1917) was a Serb activist, an organizer of the Serbian Chetnik Organization and one of the founders of the Black Hand. He was a leading civilian activist of the Pan-Serb movement in the early 20th century. In a letter to the Serbian government, dated 27 October 1909, he tells about the dangers faced by the population of Kičevo and Prilep because of Arnaut incursions, and asks for approval of the troops of Gligor Sokolović and Dane Stojanović to solve the problem.

Biography

Born in 1874 in Srbovac, a village in the municipality of Zvečan, then part of the Ottoman Empire (and now Kosovo, still a contentious international political zone to this day). As a university graduate and a tonsured monk with a chosen name Vasilije, he became a secretary to the Serbian Orthodox Metropolitanate of Skopje. In this influential post, he had numerous contacts with his people and consulates of Serbia, Russia, and France. Among the clergy, he was known as Vasilije (Radenković) and among the laity simply Bogdan Radenković.

Bogdan Radenković was a member of the Serbian Committee of Skopje and the main organizer of the Serbian Chetnik action in the Ottoman Empire. He was an intermediary between the Serbian consulate and the Chetnik organization and their supporters. During 1905 the Turkish authorities caught a farmer who after being tortured revealed that Radenković was the president of the Serbian Committee in Skopje. At the Skopje trial, the farmer recanted citing that his testimony was extracted by force and Radenković was ultimately acquitted. Radenković was a friend of Milan Rakić, then Serbia's vice-consul in Skopje, with whom he conferred confidential operational plans of the Chetnik organization. Milan Rakić at the time began writing a poem called "On Gazimestan" that became popular even before the Balkan War of 1912.

Founding of the Serb Democratic League

The Serb Democratic League in the Ottoman Empire (Serbian: Српска демократска лига у Отоманској царевини) was an Ottoman Serb political organisation established on August 13, 1908, at the First Serb Conference (August 10–13), immediately after the Young Turk Revolution. Some 26 most distinguished Serbs in the Ottoman Empire attended and Bogdan Radenković was selected to head the "Temporary Central Board of the Organization of Ottoman Serbs" in July 1908. Bishop Vicentije Krdzić of the Serbian Orthodox Eparchy of Skopje headed the clergy and Bogdan Radenković the lay membership of the  "Assembly of Ottoman Serbs in Skopje", held on Sretenje in 1909. These organizations included the Serb elite of Old Raška, Kosovo and Metohija, and Vardar Macedonia and Aegean Macedonia.[1] It included many members of the Serbian Chetnik Organization as well. They were: Bogdan Radenković; Aleksandar Bukvić; Gligorije "Gliša" Elezović; Vasa Jovanović; Milan Čemerikić; Sava Stojanović; David Dimitrijević; Đorđe Hadzi-Kostić; Velimir Prelić and Jovan Šantrić.

With the founding of the Serb Democratic League, it became the first political party to represent the interests of the Serbs in the Ottoman Empire. The Serbian Democratic League sent to Thessaloniki Bogdan Radenković, Jovan Šantrić and Đorđe Hadži-Kostić to negotiate with the Central Young Turk Board. The Serbian demands were as follows:for the three non-Muslim “ethnic groups” – Serbian, Greek and Bulgarian – to get equal number of
seats in the Ottoman Parliament. But the Young Turks refused that concept and they conditioned the electoral agreement with the Serbs with having an agreement on broader bases that would not have a national
background. In 1910 as a representative of the party, he was sent to Istanbul where he urged the Turkish authorities to stop using their troops (Bashi-bazouk) to terrorize the Serbian population in Gjilan. The Sublime Porte denied the violence in Kosovo claiming that it was a fabrication. Yet to the Albanians are credited many of the outrages that have been committed in Old Serbia, where Turkish troops are alleged to have massacred more than 60,000 Christians.

Black Hand

Radenković and a few others, particularly Colonel Dragutin Dimitrijević, were the initiators of the creation of the "Unification or Death" organization, better known as the Black Hand, in 1911. Along with Ljuba Čupa and Vojislav Tankosić,  Radenković wrote the constitution of the "Unification or Death" organization, which was modelled on similar German secret nationalistic associations and the Italian Carbonari.

Bishop
After bishop Nićifor Perić of Raška-Prizren withdrew from his office (1911), owing to disagreement with the Serbian diplomacy, the Patriarchate of Constantinople appointed Bishop Gavrilo Dožić as successor, as the Serbian diplomacy wanted. There was a conflict within the Serbian Church regarding the appointment of Gavrilo; the "Old Serbs" (clergy from Kosovo and Old Serbia) wanted their candidate, the previous secretary of the Eparchy of Skoplje, monk Vasilije (Bogdan) Radenković. While waiting for the Ottoman government approval, the Serbian government changed the decision and ordered through the consuls that Ottoman Serbs request that Radenković be appointed instead. However, Gavrilo ended up being chosen. Meanwhile, Radenković became a founder of the Black Hand conspiracy group.

Secret Mission in Korçë

After the occupation of Serbia in late 1915 by the Germans, Austrians, Hungarians and Bulgarians, Bogdan Radenković withdrew through Montenegro, Albania to the island of Corfu, where he was temporarily hospitalized with tuberculosis. When his condition improved somewhat he was sent to Athens and from there to Korçë County in eastern Albania. There he stayed until  August 1916 when a surprise Bulgarian invasion took place and he was forced to flee. He was almost caught while escaping but eventually managed to reach Thessaloniki, where the Serbian Supreme Command was stationed. Weak, suffering from tuberculosis after the harrowing escape from Korçë, he was advised by his doctor to go to Egypt where the climate may improve his condition. Nikola Pašić, however, purposefully delayed his departure until his condition worsened.

High Military Court

The Serbian Supreme Command on 15 March 1917 sent a warrant for Bogdan Radenković's arrest, though the main accused was Dragutin Dimitrijević, better known as Apis, and his associates. Radenković was sentenced to death for allegedly plotting against the prince regent Aleksandar Karadjordjević and Nikola Pašić, the head of the Serbian government-in-exile, even though there was no concrete evidence that could link him to such an outrageous plot, not him nor Dimitrijević and others.

Bogdan Radenković died of tuberculosis in a prison hospital in Thessaloniki, Greece on 30 July 1917. Years later it was revealed that Nikola Pašić fabricated the story to rid himself of Dragutin Dimitrijević and other Serbian nationalists that may pose a threat after the war during election time. All the accused were vindicated, but many years later.

See also
 List of Chetnik voivodes

References

Sources
 Вучетић, Биљана (2018). Богдан Раденковић: судбина једног српског националисте. Београд: Историјски институт. p. 355.(Vucetic, Biljana (2018) Bogdan Radenkovic, Destiny of a Serbian Nationalist. Belgrade: Institute of History, p. 355) .

External links

 

Date of birth missing
20th-century Serbian people
Serbian nationalists
Politicians from Mitrovica, Kosovo
People from the Kingdom of Serbia
Serbian Chetnik Organization
Black Hand (Serbia)
Military personnel from Mitrovica, Kosovo
1874 births
1917 deaths
Serbs from the Ottoman Empire
People from Kosovo vilayet